Balcurvie is a Scottish rural hamlet located within the Windygates district of Levenmouth in Fife.

People from Balcurvie include Sir Robert Blyth Greig FRSE (1874–1947).

References

Hamlets in Fife
Levenmouth